Ricardo McDonald (born November 8, 1969) is a former linebacker in the National Football League (NFL) that played for the Cincinnati Bengals, Chicago Bears, and the Denver Broncos. He played college football for the University of Pittsburgh under head coach Mike Gottfried and Paul Hackett.

He played for Eastside High School in Paterson, New Jersey under Coach Barrett 'Barry' Rosser. Joe Louis Clark was the school's Principal during his attendance there, as depicted in the film Lean on Me.

Family Tree
Ricardo has a twin brother Devon McDonald who played linebacker for University of Notre Dame under Coach Lou Holtz. He went on to play professionally for the Indianapolis Colts and the Arizona Cardinals. Ricardo has a son named Maurice McDonald who currently plays linebacker for Tennessee State University under Head Coach Eddie George. His younger cousin Lennox Gordon played collegiately for University of New Mexico. He went on to play professionally for the Indianapolis Colts and the Buffalo Bills. Ricardo's Nephew Maurice McDonald played Wide receiver for University of Maine from 2009-2012. His(Ricardo McDonald's) eldest daughter Brittany McDonald played basketball for Tulane University from 2010-2013. He also has a niece, Jazzmine McDonald who played for Indiana University from 2013-2016.

References

1969 births
Living people
Sportspeople from Kingston, Jamaica
Jamaican players of American football
American football linebackers
Pittsburgh Panthers football players
Cincinnati Bengals players
Chicago Bears players
American twins
Eastside High School (Paterson, New Jersey) alumni
Players of American football from Paterson, New Jersey
Jamaican twins
Twin sportspeople
Ed Block Courage Award recipients